WOLW is a radio station licensed to Cadillac, Michigan broadcasting on 91.1 FM.  WOLW airs a format consisting of Christian contemporary music and Christian talk and teaching as an affiliate of The Promise FM, and is owned by Northern Christian Radio, Inc.

References

External links 
WOLW's website

Contemporary Christian radio stations in the United States
Radio stations established in 1988
1988 establishments in Michigan
OLW